Bruno Ellinger  (born 24 May 1973 in Rosenheim, Germany) is a former competitive ice dancer who represented Austria.  Competing with partner Angelika Führing, he won three gold medals at the Austrian Figure Skating Championships from 1997 to 1999.

References
 The Figure Skating Corner: Angelika Führing & Bruno Ellinger

Navigation

Austrian male ice dancers
1973 births
Living people
People from Rosenheim
Sportspeople from Upper Bavaria